The solo free routine competition at 2013 World Aquatics Championships was held on July 22 with the preliminary round and the final on July 24.

Results
The preliminary round was held on 22 July at 09:00 and the final on 24 July at 19:00.

Green denotes finalists

References

Synchronised swimming at the 2013 World Aquatics Championships